John Ross (March 10, 1818 – January 31, 1871) was a Canadian lawyer, politician, and businessman.

Born in County Antrim, Ireland, he was brought to Canada as an infant. Ross married twice, first to Margaret Crawford who died in 1847, secondly to Augusta Elizabeth Baldwin February 4, 1851, the daughter of Robert Baldwin. Ross was president of the Grand Trunk Railway from 1853 to 1862 when he was succeeded by Sir Edward William Watkin. In 1867, he was appointed to the Senate representing the senatorial division of Ontario. A Conservative, the Honourable John Ross served until his death in 1871 in Toronto, Ontario.

Ross' son Robert Baldwin Ross, known as Robbie, had a long-term relationship with Oscar Wilde.

References 
 
 

1818 births
1871 deaths
Canadian senators from Ontario
Conservative Party of Canada (1867–1942) senators
Members of the Legislative Council of the Province of Canada
Speakers of the Senate of Canada
People from County Antrim